The 2020–21 Slovak 1. Liga season was the 28th season of the Slovak 1. Liga, the second level of ice hockey in Slovakia.

Regular season

Standings
Each team played 38 games: playing each of the other nine teams four times – 2x at home, 2x away (36 games). At the end of the regular season, the team that finished with the most points was crowned the league champion. Each 1HL team played two matches with SR 18 (1x at home and 1x outside) to support the preparation of the SR team for MS U18, I. div. sk. A 2021.

Playoffs
Eight teams qualify for the playoffs.

Bracket

Quarterfinals

Semifinals

Finals

Spišská Nová Ves wins the finals 4-1.

Final rankings

References

External links
Official website

Slovak 1. Liga seasons
Slovakia
Slovakia
2020–21 in Slovak ice hockey leagues